Ziraj (also Romanized as Zīrāj, Zerāj, and Zīrāch) is a village in Alqurat Rural District, in the Central District of Birjand County, South Khorasan Province, Iran. At the 2006 census, its population was 85, in 23 families.

References 

Populated places in Birjand County